Hiti is a surname. Notable people with the surname include:

Gorazd Hiti (born 1948), Slovene ice hockey player
Rudi Hiti (born 1946), Slovene ice hockey player